One Night Sleepover Trip is a South Korean reality television show. It is distributed by KBS2. Originally it was a Chuseok show, but after favorable reviews of its pilot episode it became a permanent weekly show on 27 February and end on 12 June 2018. KBS World then picked it up as One Night Sleepover Trip, including English subtitles.

Plot
In the show, South Korean entertainers Kim Jong-min and Lee Sang-min travel around the world couch surfing - staying at local's houses for one night. No preparations were done, so part of each episode involves finding a place to stay. During the stay, they learn about different cultures and share Korean traditions.

Cast

Hosts
Kim Jong-min
Lee Sang-min

Episodes

Ratings
 In the table below,  represent the lowest ratings and  represent the highest ratings.
 N/A denotes that the rating is not known.

References

External links
  
 

2018 South Korean television series debuts
2018 South Korean television series endings
Korean-language television shows
Korean Broadcasting System original programming
South Korean variety television shows
South Korean travel television series